In enzymology, a macrocin O-methyltransferase is an enzyme that catalyzes the chemical reaction

S-adenosyl-L-methionine + macrocin  S-adenosyl-L-homocysteine + tylosin

Thus, the two substrates of this enzyme are S-adenosyl methionine and macrocin, whereas its two products are S-adenosylhomocysteine and tylosin.

This enzyme belongs to the family of transferases, specifically those transferring one-carbon group methyltransferases.  The systematic name of this enzyme class is S-adenosyl-L-methionine:macrocin 3"'-O-methyltransferase. Other names in common use include macrocin methyltransferase, and S-adenosyl-L-methionine-macrocin O-methyltransferase.

References

 
 

EC 2.1.1
Enzymes of unknown structure